Emanuel "Leli" Fabri (born 16 December 1952) is a Maltese former football midfielder.

Playing career
During his club career, Fabri played for Luqa St. Andrew's, Qormi and Sliema Wanderers. He also played for the Malta national football team, scoring 3 times.

Career statistics

International goals

References

External links
 Emanuel Fabri at QormiFC.com
 

1952 births
Living people
Maltese footballers
Malta international footballers
Luqa St. Andrew's F.C. players
Qormi F.C. players
Sliema Wanderers F.C. players
Association football midfielders